Nar-e Kuh (also Romanized as Nar-e Kūh and Narakūh; also known as Marakūh and Narakū) is a village in Bord Khun Rural District, Bord Khun District, Deyr County, Bushehr Province, Iran. At the 2006 census, its population was 21, in 6 families.

References 

Populated places in Deyr County